Cairano is a town (commune) in the province of Avellino, Campania, Italy.

References

External links

 

Cities and towns in Campania